Crossroads Guitar Festival 2013 is a music DVD, concert film and eleventh live album by the British rock musician Eric Clapton and was released on November 18, 2013, through Warner Bros. Records. It features recordings by various artists that performed during the Crossroads Guitar Festival 2013. The release reached international album, DVD and Blu-ray charts and was certified by various organisations with gold and platinum awards.

Title list on CD 
 Tears in Heaven (Eric Clapton/Will Jennings): Eric Clapton - 4:49
 Lay Down Sally (Eric Clapton/Marcy Levy/George Terry): Eric Clapton & Vince Gill - 4:39
 Green Onions (Booker T. Jones, Jr./Stephen Lee Cropper/Alan Jackson Jr./Lewis Steinberg): Booker T. Jones  & Steve Cropper, Keb' Mo', Blake Mills, Matt "Guitar" Murphy & Albert Lee - 7:26
 Heavenly Bodies (Kurt Rosenwinkel): Kurt Rosenwinkel - 5:24
 This Time (Earl Klugh): Earl Klugh - 2.13
 Mirabella (Earl Klugh): Earl Klugh - 1:17
 Great Big Old House (Robert Cray): "The Robert Cray Band" - 5:32
 She´s Alright (McKinley Morganfield): Doyle Bramhall II & Gary Clark Jr. - 6:16
 Bullet And A Target (Clarence Copeland Greenwood): Doyle Bramhall II & Citizen Cope - 4:14
 Queen of California (John Mayer): John Mayer - 8:17
 Don't Let Me Down (John Lennon/Paul McCartney): John Mayer & Keith Urban - 6:45
 Next Door Neighbor Blues (Gary Clark Jr.): Gary Clark Jr. - 4:02
 Damn Right, I've Got The Blues (Buddy Guy): Buddy Guy & Robert Randolph & Quinn Sullivan - 6:39
 Why Does Love Got To Be So Sad (Eric Clapton/Bobby Whitlock): The Allman Brothers Band & Eric Clapton - 8:25
 Congo Square (Sonny Landreth/Mel Melton/Dave Raonson): Sonny Landreth & Derek Trucks - 6:57
 Change It (Doyle Bramhall II): John Mayer & Doyle Bramhall II - 4:36
 Oooh-Ooh-Ooh (Lloyd Price): Jimmie Vaughan - 4:52
 Save The Last Dance For Me (Doc Pomus/Mort Shuman): Blake Mills & Derek Trucks - 3:30
 Don't Worry Baby (César Rosas/Louis Pérez/T. Bone Burnett): Los Lobos - 3:41
 I Ain't Living Long Like This (Rodney Crowell): Vince Gill & Albert Lee - 6:25
 Diving Duck Blues (John Adam Estes): Taj Mahal & Keb' Mo' - 4:58
 When My Train Pulls In (Gary Clark Jr.): Gary Clark Jr. - 9:00
 Mná Na Héireann (Sean O'Riada): Jeff Beck - 4:21
 The Needle And The Damage Done (Neil Young): Gregg Allman, Warren Haynes, Derek Trucks - 2:38
 Midnight Rider ([[Gregg Allman/[[Robert Kim Payne): Gregg Allman, Warren Haynes, Derek Trucks - 3:33
 Key To The Highway (William Lee Conley Broonzy/Charles Segar): Eric Clapton & Keith Richards - 4:35
 Gin House Blues (Henry Troy/Fletcher Henderson): Andy Fairwather Low & Eric Clapton - 5:48
 Got To Get Better In A Little While (Eric Clapton): Eric Clapton - 6:35
 Sunshine of Your Love (Jack Bruce/Peter Ronald Brown/Eric Clapton): Eric Clapton - 6:24

Chart performance

Album release

Weekly charts

Video concert

Weekly charts

Year-end charts

Certifications

References

External links
 Crossroads Guitar Festival 2013 at the Internet Movie Database
 

Eric Clapton video albums
2010s English-language films